Megachile kuehni is a species of bee in the family Megachilidae. It was described by Friese in 1903.

References

Kuehni
Insects described in 1903